The 2023 Sakhir FIA Formula 3 round was a motor racing event held on 4 and 5 March 2023 at the Bahrain International Circuit, Sakhir, Bahrain. It was the opening round of the 2023 FIA Formula 3 Championship and was held in support of the 2023 Bahrain Grand Prix.

Background

Team changes 
German Formula 4 team PHM Racing took over the entry and assets of Charouz Racing System at the end of the 2022 season, and runs in cooperation with the Czech squad under the PHM Racing by Charouz moniker.

Weekend report 

Gabriele Minì, driving for Hitech, had an impressive start in his Formula 3 career as he took pole position by only 0.051 seconds. However, he was not able to convert pole into a race victory on Sunday's Feature Race after receiving a five-second time-penalty for failing to follow the correct starting procedure. Thus, fellow rookie Gabriel Bortoleto, driving for Trident, inherited the win to make possible a Trident 1-2 alongside fellow rookie Oliver Goethe, whilst Minì dropped to eighth place because of the penalty. Dino Beganovic finished third to complete an all-rookie podium ceremony on Sunday. 

Previously, Campos Racing driver Pepe Martí took his maiden victory in Formula 3 as he won the Sprint Race on Saturday ahead of Franco Colapinto, who is considered to be one of the championship contenders heading into the 2023 season.

After the first round, Feature Race winner Bortoleto took the lead in the standings with 26 points ahead of Goethe (23) and Beganovic (22), whilst Trident is the first leader with 52 points, currenlty leading by 24 points over reigning teams' champion Prema Racing.

Classification

Qualifying 

Notes
 – Oliver Gray originally qualified twenty-first, but later received a three-place grid drop for Saturday's Sprint race after he was found to have impeded Roberto Faria at Turn 15.

Sprint race 

Notes
 – Gabriel Bortoleto originally finished twelfth, but was later given a ten-second time penalty for causing a collision with Rafael Villagómez on lap 2, demoting him to nineteenth place.

Feature race 

Notes
 – Paul Aron originally finished eleventh, but was later given a five-second time-penalty for causing a collision with Zak O'Sullivan.
 – Oliver Gray originally finished eighteenth, but was later given a five-second time-penalty for track limits violations.
 – Tommy Smith and Alex García both retired from the race, but were classifed as they completed over 90% of the race distance.

Standings after the event 

Drivers' Championship standings

Teams' Championship standings

 Note: Only the top five positions are included for both sets of standings.

See also 
 2023 Bahrain Grand Prix
 2023 Sakhir Formula 2 round

Notes

References

External links 

 Official website

Sakhir
Sakhir Formula 3
Sakhir Formula 3